The 1988 McDonald's Open took place at Palacio de los Deportes in Madrid, Spain.

Participants

Games
All games were held at the Palacio de los Deportes in Madrid, Spain.

Final standings

Sources
Celtics 1988
Bird scored 27 points

External links
NBA International Pre-Season and Regular-Season Games
List of champions at a-d-c

1988–89
1988–89 in American basketball
1988–89 in Italian basketball
1988–89 in Spanish basketball
1988–89 in Yugoslav basketball
International basketball competitions hosted by Spain